This is a list of 180 species in Smicridea, a genus of netspinning caddisflies in the family Hydropsychidae.

Smicridea species

 Smicridea abrupta Flint, 1974 i c g
 Smicridea acuminata Flint, 1974 i c g
 Smicridea aequalis Banks, 1920 i c g
 Smicridea albifrontalis Martynov, 1912 i c g
 Smicridea albosignata Ulmer, 1907 i c g
 Smicridea alticola Flint, 1964 i c g
 Smicridea amplispina Flint, 1981 i c g
 Smicridea anaticula Flint, 1981 i c g
 Smicridea andicola Flint, 1991 i c g
 Smicridea annulicornis (Blanchard in Gay , 1851) i c g
 Smicridea anomala Flint & Denning, 1989 i c g
 Smicridea anticura Flint & Denning, 1989 i c g
 Smicridea appendicula Flint, 1974 i c g
 Smicridea appendiculata Flint, 1972 i c g
 Smicridea araguaiense  g
 Smicridea argentina (Navas, 1918) i c g
 Smicridea aries Blahnik, 1995 i c g
 Smicridea arizonensis Flint, 1974 i c g
 Smicridea astarte Malicky, 1980 i c g
 Smicridea aterrima Ulmer, 1911 i c g
 Smicridea atrobasis Flint, 1983 i c g
 Smicridea aurra Flint, 1991 i c g
 Smicridea australis Ulmer, 1908 i c g
 Smicridea banksi Flint, 1967 i c g
 Smicridea bicornuta  g
 Smicridea bidactyla Flint & Reyes-Arrunategui, 1991 i c g
 Smicridea bidentata Martynov, 1912 i c g
 Smicridea bifasciata  g
 Smicridea bifurcata Flint, 1974 i c g
 Smicridea biserrulata Flint, 1991 i c g
 Smicridea bivittata (Hagen, 1861) i c g
 Smicridea brasiliana (Ulmer, 1905) i c g
 Smicridea breviuncata Flint, 1974 i c g
 Smicridea bulara Flint & Denning, 1989 i c g
 Smicridea bulbosa Flint, 1974 i c g
 Smicridea caldwelli Ross, 1947 i c g
 Smicridea caligata Flint, 1974 i c g
 Smicridea calopa Flint, 1974 i c g
 Smicridea campana Flint, 1974 i c g
 Smicridea cariba Flint, 1968 i c g
 Smicridea cartiensis Flint & Denning, 1989 i c g
 Smicridea catherinae Blahnik, 1995 i c g
 Smicridea chicoana Flint, 1983 i c g
 Smicridea cholta Flint, 1974 i c g
 Smicridea circinata Flint & Denning, 1989 i c g
 Smicridea columbiana (Ulmer, 1905) i c
 Smicridea comma Banks, 1924 i c g
 Smicridea completa Banks, 1941 i c g
 Smicridea complicatissima Flint & Denning, 1989 i c g
 Smicridea compostela Bueno-Soria, 1986 i c g
 Smicridea conjuncta Flint, 1991 i c g
 Smicridea cornuta Flint, 1974 i c g
 Smicridea coronata Flint, 1980 i c g
 Smicridea corralita Flint & Denning, 1989 i c g
 Smicridea cubana Kumanski, 1987 i c g
 Smicridea cuna Flint, 1974 i c g
 Smicridea curvipenis Flint, 1991 i c g
 Smicridea dampfi Flint, 1974 i c g
 Smicridea decora (Navás, 1930) i c
 Smicridea dentifera Flint, 1983 i c g
 Smicridea dentisserrata  g
 Smicridea discalis Flint, 1972 i c g
 Smicridea dispar (Banks, 1905) i c g b
 Smicridea dithyra Flint, 1974 i c g
 Smicridea ephippifera Flint, 1978 i c g
 Smicridea erecta Flint, 1974 i c g
 Smicridea fasciatella McLachlan, 1871 i c g
 Smicridea filicata Flint & Denning, 1989 i c g
 Smicridea flinti  g
 Smicridea forcipata Flint, 1983 i c g
 Smicridea franciscana  g
 Smicridea frequens (Navás, 1930) i c g
 Smicridea fuscifurca Botosaneanu, 1998 i c g
 Smicridea gemina Blahnik, 1995 i c g
 Smicridea gladiator Flint, 1978 i c g
 Smicridea gomezi Blahnik, 1995 i c g
 Smicridea gomphotheria Blahnik, 1995 i c g
 Smicridea grandis Flint, 1968 i c g
 Smicridea grandisaccata Flint, 1991 i c g
 Smicridea grenadensis Flint, 1968 i c g
 Smicridea helenae Albino & Pes, 2011 g
 Smicridea holzenthali Flint & Denning, 1989 i c g
 Smicridea hybrida Blahnik, 1995 i c g
 Smicridea iguazu Flint, 1983 i c g
 Smicridea inaequispina Flint, 1974 i c g
 Smicridea inarmata Flint, 1974 i c g
 Smicridea jamaicensis Flint, 1968 i c g
 Smicridea jundiai Almeida & Flint, 2002 g
 Smicridea karukerae Botosaneanu, 1994 i c g
 Smicridea lacanja Bueno-Soria & Hamilton, 1986 i c g
 Smicridea latipala Flint & Denning, 1989 i c g
 Smicridea lobata (Ulmer, 1909) i c g
 Smicridea magdalenae Flint, 1991 i c g
 Smicridea magnipinnata Flint, 1991 i c g
 Smicridea manzanara Flint & Denning, 1989 i c g
 Smicridea marlieri Flint, 1978 i c g
 Smicridea marua Flint, 1978 i c g
 Smicridea matagalpa Flint, 1974 i c g
 Smicridea matancilla Flint & Denning, 1989 i c g
 Smicridea meridensis Botosaneanu & Flint, 1982 i c g
 Smicridea mesembrina (Navas, 1918) i c g
 Smicridea microsaccata Flint, 1991 i c g
 Smicridea minima Flint, 1968 i c g
 Smicridea minuscula Flint, 1973 i c g
 Smicridea mirama Flint & Denning, 1989 i c g
 Smicridea mucronata Flint & Denning, 1989 i c g
 Smicridea multidens Flint & Denning, 1989 i c g
 Smicridea murina McLachlan, 1871 i c g
 Smicridea nahuatl Flint, 1974 i c g
 Smicridea nanda Flint, 1983 i c g
 Smicridea necator  g
 Smicridea nemorosa Holzenthal & Blahnik, 1995 i c g
 Smicridea nigerrima Flint, 1983 i c g
 Smicridea nigricans Flint, 1991 i c g
 Smicridea nigripennis Banks, 1920 i c g
 Smicridea obesa Banks, 1938 i c g
 Smicridea obliqua Flint, 1974 i c g
 Smicridea octospina Flint, 1974 i c g
 Smicridea olivacea Flint, 1983 i c g
 Smicridea palifera Flint, 1981 i c g
 Smicridea pallidivittata Flint, 1972 i c g
 Smicridea palmar Sganga, 2005 g
 Smicridea pampena Flint, 1980 i c g
 Smicridea paranensis Flint, 1983 i c g
 Smicridea parva Banks, 1939 i c g
 Smicridea parvula Mosely in Mosely & Kimmins, 1953 i c g
 Smicridea penai Flint & Denning, 1989 i c g
 Smicridea peruana (Martynov, 1912) i c g
 Smicridea petasata Flint, 1981 i c g
 Smicridea pipila Flint, 1974 i c g
 Smicridea piraya Flint, 1983 i c g
 Smicridea polyfasciata Martynov, 1912 i c g
 Smicridea probolophora Flint, 1991 i c g
 Smicridea prorigera Flint, 1991 i c g
 Smicridea protera (Denning, 1948) i c g
 Smicridea pseudolobata Flint, 1978 i c g
 Smicridea pseudoradula Flint, 1991 i c g
 Smicridea pucara Flint & Denning, 1989 i c g
 Smicridea radula Flint, 1974 i c g
 Smicridea rara Bueno-Soria, 1979 i c g
 Smicridea redunca Flint & Denning, 1989 i c g
 Smicridea reinerti Flint, 1978 i c g
 Smicridea riita Flint, 1981 i c g
 Smicridea roraimense Albino & Pes, 2011 g
 Smicridea ruginasa Flint, 1991 i c g
 Smicridea salta Flint, 1974 i c g
 Smicridea sattleri Denning & Sykora, 1968 i c g
 Smicridea saucia McLachlan, 1871 i c g
 Smicridea scutellaria Flint, 1974 i c g
 Smicridea sepala  g
 Smicridea sexspinosa Flint, 1978 i c g
 Smicridea signata (Banks, 1903) i c g b
 Smicridea simmonsi Flint, 1968 i c g
 Smicridea singri Holzenthal & Blahnik, 1995 i c g
 Smicridea sirena Bueno-Soria, 1986 i c g
 Smicridea smilodon Flint & Denning, 1989 i c g
 Smicridea soyatepecana Bueno-Soria, 1986 i c g
 Smicridea spinulosa Flint, 1972 i c g
 Smicridea talamanca Flint, 1974 i c g
 Smicridea tapanti Holzenthal & Blahnik, 1995 i c g
 Smicridea tarasca Flint, 1974 i c g
 Smicridea titschacki Flint, 1975 i c g
 Smicridea tobada Flint & Denning, 1989 i c g
 Smicridea tregala Flint & Denning, 1989 i c g
 Smicridea truncata Flint, 1974 i c g
 Smicridea turgida Flint & Denning, 1989 i c g
 Smicridea turrialbana Flint, 1974 i c g
 Smicridea ulmeri Banks, 1939 i c g
 Smicridea ulva Flint, 1974 i c g
 Smicridea unguiculata Flint, 1983 i c g
 Smicridea unicolor (Banks, 1901) i c g
 Smicridea urra Flint, 1991 i c g
 Smicridea varia (Banks, 1913) i c g
 Smicridea ventridenticulata Flint, 1991 i c g
 Smicridea veracruzensis Flint, 1974 i c g
 Smicridea vermiculata Flint, 1978 i c g
 Smicridea vilela Flint, 1978 i c g
 Smicridea villarricensis Flint, 1983 i c g
 Smicridea voluta Flint, 1978 i c g
 Smicridea weidneri Flint, 1972 i c g

Data sources: i = ITIS, c = Catalogue of Life, g = GBIF, b = Bugguide.net

References

Smicridea
Articles created by Qbugbot